Kristine Lindblom (born 10 November 1982) is a retired Norwegian football midfielder.

She started her youth career in Kolbotn IL, playin on the same girls' team as Solveig Gulbrandsen and Kristin Blystad Bjerke. She spent her senior career in Kolbotn as well, before venturing into Damallsvenskan with Jitex BK.

She made her debut for the Norway women's national football team in China in 2003, played twice in the 2004 Algarve Cup and won her last cap in 2008.

References

1982 births
Living people
People from Oppegård
Norwegian women's footballers
Kolbotn Fotball players
Toppserien players
Norway women's youth international footballers
Norway women's international footballers
Women's association football midfielders
Norwegian expatriate women's footballers
Expatriate footballers in Sweden
Norwegian expatriate sportspeople in Sweden
Damallsvenskan players
Sportspeople from Viken (county)